Sir George Courthorpe (3 June 1616 – 18 November 1685) was an English politician who sat in the House of Commons  between 1656 and 1679.

Courthorpe was the son of George Courthorpe, of Ticehurst, Sussex. He matriculated at University College, Oxford on 22 June 1632 aged 16, and was awarded BA on 8 May 1635.

In 1656, Courthorpe was elected Member of Parliament for Sussex in the Second Protectorate Parliament. In 1659 he was elected MP for East Grinstead in the Third Protectorate Parliament. He was re-elected MP for East Grinstead in the Convention Parliament in 1660. In 1661, he was  knighted at Windsor on 24 April and re-elected MP for East Grinstead in the Cavalier Parliament  He sat until 1679.

Courthorpe died at the age of 69  and was buried at Ticehurst.

References

 

1616 births
1685 deaths
Alumni of University College, Oxford
English MPs 1656–1658
English MPs 1659
English MPs 1660
English MPs 1661–1679